Franz Krauthausen (born 27 February 1946 in Oberhausen) is a German former professional footballer who played as a midfielder or forward. He spent seven seasons in the Bundesliga with 1. FC Köln, Rot-Weiß Oberhausen, FC Bayern Munich and FC Schalke 04, after which he finished his career playing in the US league.

References

Honours
 Bundesliga: 1971–72, 1972–73

External links
 
 Franz Krauthausen at VI.nl 

1946 births
Living people
German footballers
Association football midfielders
1. FC Köln players
Rot-Weiß Oberhausen players
FC Bayern Munich footballers
FC Schalke 04 players
FC Volendam players
Bundesliga players
Las Vegas Quicksilver players
San Diego Sockers (NASL) players
California Surf players
North American Soccer League (1968–1984) players
North American Soccer League (1968–1984) indoor players
German expatriate footballers
German expatriate sportspeople in the Netherlands
Expatriate footballers in the Netherlands
German expatriate sportspeople in the United States
Expatriate soccer players in the United States
Sportspeople from Oberhausen
Footballers from North Rhine-Westphalia